Yousuf Shaaban Al-Busaidi (born 4 November 1984), commonly known as Yousuf Shaaban, is an Omani footballer who plays for Dhofar S.C.S.C.

Club career
In 2011, he moved to Barka-based club Al-Shabab Club and played for two seasons scoring 6 goals. On 24 September 2013, Yousuf signed a one-year contract with his first most club Dhofar S.C.S.C. On 24 July 2013, he again signed a contract with his former club Al-Shabab Club.

International career
Yousuf was part of the first team squad of the Oman national football team till 2008. He was selected for the national team for the first time in 2004. He has made appearances in the 2004 AFC Asian Cup qualification, the 2004 AFC Asian Cup, the 2007 AFC Asian Cup qualification, the 2007 AFC Asian Cup and the 2009 Gulf Cup of Nations.

FIFA World Cup Qualification
Yousuf has made four appearances in the 2006 FIFA World Cup qualification. His only goal for Oman in FIFA World Cup qualification matches came in the Second Round of 2006 FIFA World Cup qualification in a 2-0 win over Singapore.

National team career statistics

Goals for senior national team
Scores and results list Oman's goal tally first.

References

External links
 
 
 
 
 

1984 births
Living people
Omani footballers
Oman international footballers
Association football forwards
2004 AFC Asian Cup players
2007 AFC Asian Cup players
Dhofar Club players
Al-Shabab SC (Seeb) players
Oman Professional League players
Footballers at the 2002 Asian Games
Asian Games competitors for Oman
People from Barka, Oman